Alexis Stamatis (born Athens, 1960) is a Greek novelist, playwright and poet. Amongst other work, he has published sixteen novels, six books of poetry and a number of plays. As of 2011, he teaches creative writing at the Hellenic American Academic Foundation.

Biography
Son of Kostas Stamatis, an architect, and Betty Arvaniti, a film actress, Stamatis studied architecture at the National Technical University of Athens and took postgraduate degrees in architecture and cinematography in London.

He has published sixteen novels. His second novel, Βar Flaubert (Kedros, 2000), a critically acclaimed bestseller in Greece, has been published in UK, France, Italy, Spain, Portugal, Serbia and Bulgaria. Bar Flaubert has been adapted as a screenplay by the author and the director Vassilis Douvlis. Stamatis has also published six books of poetry. His second book, The Architecture of Interior Spaces, was awarded the Nikiforos Vrettakos Prize in 1994. Τwo collections of his poems have been translated in Great Britain. He wrote the libretti for two musical pieces performed in Megaron Mousikis and the Chora theatre. In 2004, he participated at the International Writing Program of the University of Iowa through a Greek Fulbright Artists & Art-Scholars Award.

In 2007, the US publishing house Etruscan Press won the 1st International Literary award from the US National Endowment for the Arts to publish his novel American Fugue. Stamatis presented his book in the US in 2008. His tour included around 15 universities all over the country, including Harvard, Yale, New York University, San Francisco State University and Brown. 
.

He has written the following plays, among others: Last Martha, Monologue for the Cultural Olympiad; directed and performed by Dimitris Ikonomou (2003), Dakrygona (Tear Gas), 2010, and Kill Your Darlings, 2012, three-act plays, staged at the Theatre of Kefallinias Street and directed by Aris Troupakis, Melissia, National Theater of Greece 2012 (play reading), Midnight in a perfect world, Monologue (2013) directed by Aris Troupakis and staged at Theatro Technis Karolos Koun, Innerview, one-act play, staged at Southbank Centre, London (2013). for the event "Greece is the word!", Innerview, three-act play, which was later staged at the Michael Cacoyiannis Foundation, 2014–15.

In 2009 he was writer in residence in Shanghai, invited by the Shanghai Writers Association. He has represented Greece in various Book Festivals and seminars all over the world. He has been working for many major Greek newspapers and magazines. Ηe currently teaches creative writing at the Hellenic American Academic Foundation (Athens College – Psychico College)

On 19 October 2013 he took part in the event "Greece is the Word" at the Southbank Centre London. 

He was interviewed by Victoria Hislop and a short play of his, "Innerview", was staged with the actors Eva Simatou and Nikos Poursanidis. He is married to the actress Eva Simatou. They have a son Ermis.

Novels

1998 – The Seventh Elephant. Kedros, 2nd edition, Kastaniotis, 2016
2000 – Bar Flaubert. Kedros, 16th edition, 2011, 32th edition, Kastaniotis, 2023
2002 – Like a Thief in the night. Kastaniotis, 4th edition, 2009
2003 – Theseus Street. Kastaniotis, 4th edition, 2004
2005 – Mother Ash . Kastaniotis, 5th edition, 2005
2006 – American Fugue. Kastaniotis, 4th edition, 2007
2008 – Villa Combray, Kastaniotis, 9th edition, 2014
2009 – Kill your darlings, Kastaniotis 4th edition, 2010
2011 – Sunday, Kastaniotis 2nd edition, 2011
2012 – Can you cry underwater?, Kastaniotis, 3rd edition, 2013
2013 – Chameleons. Kastaniotis, 2013, 2nd edition, 2014
2014 – Melissia. Kastaniotis, 2014, 2nd edition, 2015
2015 – The book of rain, Kastaniotis, 2015
2017 – Motel Morena, Kastaniotis, 2017
2018 – The man of the fifth act, Kastaniotis, 2018
2020 – Innocent Creatures, Kastaniotis, 2020
2021 – The White Room, Kastaniotis, 2021
2023 – I’ve been so many others, Kastaniotis, 2023

Novellas and short stories

2002 – Scorpio in the drawer (novella). Ellinika Grammata, editions
2005 – Zoi (novella). Minoas Editions
2007 – Stories for Lonely People (short stories), Topos editions
2010 – The errand boy – Kurtz Revisited (short story), Magic Box editions ("The Book of Evil")
2010 – Legendary Tales (short stories), Kastaniotis editions
2014 – Zoi (novella), Minoas Editions [re-issue, 2nd edition 2014]

Novel translations

2000 – The Seventh Elephant. Arcadia Books, London, UK
2002 – Bar Flaubert. Crocceti Editions, Milano, Italy
2003 – Bar Flaubert. Alter Edit, Paris, France
2006 – Bar Flaubert. Rd Editores, Seville, Spain
2007 – Bar Flaubert. Livre de Poche, Hachette, Paris, France
2007 – Bar Flaubert. Arcadia Books, London, UK
2008 – American Fugue. Etruscan Press, USA
2008 – Fuga Americana. Crocceti Editions, Milano, Italy
2009 – Bar Flaubert. Archipelag editions, Belgrade, Serbia
2010 – Mother Ash. Nemesis Editions, Istanbul, Turkey
2011 – Bar Flaubert. Porto Editora, Lisboa, Portugal
2013 – Mother Ash, Kastaniotis edition [in English]
2015 – Bar Flaubert, Panorama, Sophia, Bulgaria

Poetry collections

1992 – The Corner of the World. Socolis Editions
1993 – Architecture of the Intimate Spaces. Kastaniotis Editions
1995 – A Simple Method of Three. Kastaniotis Editions
1999 – Dense Now. Ellinika Grammata editions
2002 – The closer I get the more the future gets away. Rodakio
2004 – We are never alone. Kastaniotis Editions.

Poetry translations

2001 – Collected Poetry of Alexis Stamatis. Dionysia Press, Edinburgh
2003 – Dense Now. Dionysia Press, Edinburgh
2014 – We are never alone. Dionysia Press, Edinburgh (under publication).

Children's books

2008 – Alkis and the Labyrinth. Kastaniotis Editions (IBBY award)
2022 – Talentina. Kastaniotis Editions

Theatrical plays

2008 – Last Martha, Ianos Editions.
2009 – Genesis. Two Monologues (The Errant Boy & Genesis), Socolis – Kouledakis Editions
2010 – Dakrygona (Tear Gas)
2012 – Kill your darlings, Socolis – Kouledakis editions
2013 – Midnight in a perfect world – Theatro Technos Karolos Koun editions
2014 – Melissia Editions théâtrales de la maison Antoine Vitez
2014 – Innerview Philotypon editions

Theatre, opera, and cinema

Theatre
2002–2003 – Look at me. Opera Theatre Group, Chororoes Theatre; directed by Theo Abazis
2002 – Last Martha. Monologue for the Cultural Olympiad; directed and performed by Dimitris Ikonomou
2008 – Last Martha. Monologue; Theatre of Kefallinias Street, directed by Vicky Georgiadou and performed by Christos Stergioglou
2009 – Genesis. Two Monologues (The Errant Boy & Genesis), Chora Theatre, directed by Avra Sidiropoulou and performed by Christos Stergioglou and Rinio Kyriazis respectively
2010 – Dream a little dream of me, one-act play, directed by Ektoras Lygizos, performed by Dimitris Makalias, Michalis Oikonomou, Danai Papoutsi for the "24 Hour Plays Athens" (Chora Theater)
2010 – Dakrygona (Tear Gas), play, Theatre of Kefallinias Street directed by Aris Troupakis.
2011 – Thalamos, one-act play, Theatre "Synetgeion" directed by Giolanda Markopoulou, and performed by Maria Aiginitou, Despoina Kourti, Charis Charalambous (part of the play "Exodus")
2012 – Kill Your Darlings, play, Theatre of Kefallinias Street directed by Aris Troupakis
2012 – Melissia, National Theater of Greece directed by Eleni Boza (reading)
2013 – Midnight in a perfect world. Monologue, directed by Aris Troupakis and performed by Nikos Arvanitis at Theatro Technis Karolos Koun (Athens Art Theatre)
2013 – Innerview One-act play. Staged at the Southbank Centre, London, for the event "Greece is the word!" Performed by Nikos Poursanidis and Eva Simatou, directed by the writer and the actors 
2014 – Innerview Three-act play. Staged at the Michael Cacoyiannis Foundation, directed by Lilly Meleme performed by Nikos Arvanitis, Eva Simatou, produced by Lycophos productions and Giorgos Lykiardopoulos
2018 – Kosmos Gonia Staged at the Second Stage of Kefallinias Street Theatre, directed by Aris Troupakis performed by Nikos Arvanitis, Nikos Alexiou
2019 – Melissia Five-act play. Staged at the National Theatre of Greece, directed by George Paloumbis, performed by Betty Arvaniti, Nikos Arvanitis, Nikos Hatzopoulos, Mari Kechagiogou, Nefeli Kouri, Kostas Vasardanis
2019 – Blue Room Play reading at the Theatro Technis, directed by Manos Karatzogiannis, performed by Anna Fonsou, Lena Papaligoura, Eva Simatou, Nickos Vatikiotis
2021 – White Room Staged at the Stathmos Theatre, directed by Manos Karatzogiannis, performed by Smaragda Smyrnaiou, Peggy Stathacopoulou, Eva Simatou, Dimitris Tsiklis

Opera
2000 – Socrates. Megaro Mousikis, music by Theo Abazis, directed by Victor Ardittes
2000 – A walk in Hades. Orchestra of Colours, Chora Theatre, music by Theo Abazis.

Cinema
2002 – Bar Flaubert. With the film director Vassilis Douvlis Stamatis co-wrote a screenplay based on his novel Bar Flaubert sponsored by the program "GRAFI" of the Greek National Film Center
2007–09 – Storm. Original screenplay for a Haris Patramanis film
2014 – Light director-screenwriter Vassilis Douvlis. Script editor.

Ipad applications

2012 Conceived and wrote the text for the iPad application "itravel Us" developed by Top Creations and Propaganda

Awards
1994 – 1st award of the City of Athens in memory of the Greek poet Nikiforos Vrettakos for his second book of poetry: "Architecture of the Intimate Spaces" Athens, 16 March 1994.
2004 – Greek Fulbright Artists & Art-Scholars Award
2007 – Etruscan Press won the 1st International Literary Award by the US National Endowment of Arts for Alexis Stamatis' novel American Fugue
2009 – First Award of The Circle of the Greek Children's Book- IBBY Greece, for his children's book Alkis and the Labyrinth

Notes

External links
 Facebook page
 Alexis Stamatis's blog 

Living people
Greek architects
National Technical University of Athens alumni
20th-century Greek novelists
21st-century Greek novelists
Greek screenwriters
21st-century Greek dramatists and playwrights
International Writing Program alumni
20th-century Greek poets
21st-century Greek poets
1960 births
Writers from Athens